William Rennie was a Canadian farmer who became a successful seed merchant, educator, and writer on agriculture.
Rennie's parents were farmers.  Rennie started farming his own 120 acre section (Concession II Lot 14 in then Markham Township and now eastside of Bayview Avenue south of 16th Avenue of Richmond Hill) in 1860.
But in 1867 he rented out his farm, moved to Toronto, and opened a seed company that sold both vegetable and floral seeds.  Most of his customers purchased their seeds through a colorful mail order catalogue.

Rennie retired in 1889, turning over management of his business to three of his four sons, Robert, John and Thomas Rennie.
(His fourth son, William Jr, became a Presbyterian missionary.)
After his retirement Rennie became the first official farm manager of the model farm at the Faculty of Agriculture at the University of Guelph, where he authored two book on farm management.

References

Canadian farmers
Canadian non-fiction writers
Canadian horticulturists
1835 births
1910 deaths